Boomerang (Korean: 부메랑; RR: Boomerang) is the South Korean version of the original United States television channel, which launched on 14 November 2015. It is owned by Warner Bros. Discovery under its International division, and primarily airs both foreign and Korean-produced animated series that target young children.

See also
 Boomerang

References

External links 
  

Children's television channels in South Korea
Boomerang (TV network)
Television channels in South Korea
Television channels and stations established in 2015
2015 establishments in South Korea